Ngee Ann City is a shopping and commercial centre located on Orchard Road, Singapore. The S$520 million building was officially opened on 21 September 1993 by then-Prime Minister Goh Chok Tong.

Ngee Ann City currently houses the High Commission of New Zealand, on the 15th floor of Tower A.

History
In the 1950s, the land that Ngee Ann City sits on was a burial ground, owned and managed by Ngee Ann Kongsi. It was part of a parcel of land known as Tai Shan Ting, which was bounded by Orchard Road, Paterson Road, and Grange Road. A ten-storey Ngee Ann Building was then built on the site, and was demolished to make way for Ngee Ann City.

Redevelopment of the site was first considered as early as 1967. Ngee Ann City was planned by Ngee Ann Development and the Orchard Square Development Corporation in the late 1980s. Raymond Woo, the architect who designed the complex, drew inspiration from the Great Wall of China. The intent was to reflect the dignity, solidity and strength of the Ngee Ann Kongsi. Wong spent five years designing and overseeing the project.

Work on Ngee Ann City began 22 years after the project was first proposed. The construction of the S$520 million complex took four years. Ngee Ann City was officially opened by Prime Minister Goh Chok Tong on 21 September 1993.

Facilities

Ngee Ann City has two office towers, Tower A and B which are both 26 storeys high. Among its many shops are the Takashimaya department store and Kinokuniya, the second-largest bookstore in Southeast Asia. Until 2007, it housed the library@orchard, part of the National Library Board on the 5th floor. Ngee Ann City is also home to the largest Best Denki in Singapore, known as Big Best. In 2005, the shopping mall opened an art and creativity section on the 4th floor called iFORUM, the first of its kind in Singapore.

When Ngee Ann City opened in 1993, Tangs Studio (a division of Tangs) occupied three floors of the building at the Tower B section of the building. A few years later, Level 2 of the department store was closed in 1999 due to poor business. This part of the mall became part of the speciality shop section (mainly branded boutiques) on the mall on Level 2, Books Kinokuniya on Level 3, and a shop section mainly children's boutiques and shops on Level 4 that was converted to iForum in 2005. The top floor of the mall, Level 5, was part of the upper level carpark. In 1997, the 5th floor was converted to retail space.

The Civic Plaza is where roadshows, concerts, functions, performances and activities are held. There is a fountain at the front of the Civic Plaza facing Orchard Road. The building is connected by underpasses to Wisma Atria, ION Orchard, Wheelock Place, Isetan and Lucky Plaza.

The two towers of Ngee Ann City were intended by the designer to symbolise Chinese door gods, representing strength, generosity, and unity. Tenants in the office tower include Takashimaya Singapore, Books Kinokuniya, Metro department store, Ngee Ann Development, some private office tenants and a medical floor on Level 8 of Tower B.

Toshin Development Singapore Pte. Ltd. manages the speciality stores area of Takashimaya Shopping Centre located from basement 2 to level 4 of Ngee Ann City, covering over 370,000 square feet.

References

 "Ngee Ann City comes alive", The Straits Times, 7 August 1993
 Tan Sung, "Takashimaya ready to face sluggish sector", The Straits Times, 6 August 1993

External links
 Takashimaya Department Store
 Takashimaya Shopping Centre
 Ngee Ann City

Commercial buildings completed in 1993
Orchard, Singapore
Orchard Road
Skyscraper office buildings in Singapore
Shopping malls established in 1993
Shopping malls in Singapore
Tourist attractions in Singapore
1993 establishments in Singapore
20th-century architecture in Singapore